The western spindalis (Spindalis zena) is a songbird species. It was formerly considered conspecific with the other three species of spindalis, with the common name stripe-headed tanager.

Taxonomy
The spindalises were traditionally considered aberrant tanagers of the family Thraupidae, but like the equally enigmatic bananaquit (Coereba flaveola), they are formally treated as incertae sedis (place uncertain) among the nine-primaried oscines until the recognition of the family spindalidae.

Description
The male is brightly colored with a black and white horizontally striped head and contrasting burnt orange throat, breast and nape. The remainder of the belly is light grey. There are two color variations: green-backed (generally northern) and black-backed (generally northern). The female has similar markings on the head, but washed out to a medium grey. She is olive-grey above and greyish-brown below, with a slight orange wash on the breast, rump, and shoulders.

Distribution and habitat
The species is found in southeastern Florida and the western Caribbean (Cozumel, the Cayman Islands, Cuba, the Bahamas and the Turks and Caicos Islands). It is a rare visitor of extreme southern Florida, where the subspecies S. z. zena successfully bred in 2009.

Its natural habitats are subtropical or tropical moist lowland forests, subtropical or tropical moist montane forest, and heavily degraded former forest. The subspecies zena is found in pine forest.

Conservation
It is not considered a threatened species by the IUCN.

Subspecies
 Spindalis zena zena: Central Bahamas
 Spindalis zena townsendi: Grand Bahama Island, the Abacos and Green Turtle Cay
 Spindalis zena pretrei: Cuba, Isle of Pines and adjacent offshore cays
 Spindalis zena salvini: Grand Cayman Island
 Spindalis zena benedicti: Cozumel Island

References

External links

 
 
 
 
 
 
 

western spindalis
Native birds of the Southeastern United States
Birds of the Caribbean
western spindalis
western spindalis
Taxonomy articles created by Polbot